Xu Lianjie (born 1953), also known as Hui Lin Chit, is a Chinese billionaire businessman, CEO of Hengan International.

In 1985, he co-founded Hengan International with Shi Wenbo, and they produce sanitary napkins and baby diapers.

As of October 2015, Forbes estimated his net worth at US$2.6 billion.

References

1953 births
Living people
Billionaires from Fujian
Businesspeople from Fujian
People from Jinjiang, Fujian
Chinese company founders